Caloocan City Business High School (CCBHS) is a business and technical-skills oriented public high school in Caloocan, Metro Manila, Philippines. It offers ABM (Accountancy, Business and Management), HUMSS (Humanities and Social Sciences), STEM (Science, Technology, Engineering, and Mathematics) and TVL (Technical Vocational Livelihood) for Senior High School Students.

Formerly known as Urduja Business High School, it is located at Sikatuna Ext., Urduja Village, Barangay 172, Caloocan. 
Caloocan City Business High School  (CCBHS) is operated by the local city government.

The school is intended for students who want to excel in fields of technology and business. As of now, CCBHS ranked 1st in 'National Achievement Test' in Caloocan.

The school was developed into an integrated high school in Caloocan that offers Grade 7 to Grade 12 levels, starting A.Y 2017–2018.

CCBHS' program is open to all Junior High School completers who want to enhance and hone their skills in different areas.

The school currently offers Senior High School tracks:
Academic Track
Strands: Accountancy, Business and Management (ABM), Humanities and Social Sciences (HUMSS), and opened Science, Technology, Engineering, and Mathematics (STEM) strand on A.Y. 2018–2019.

Technical-Vocational-Livelihood (TVL) Track
Strands: Information and Communications Technology (ICT), and Cookery.

The school currently has three functional buildings (2 four-storey, and 1 three-storey), and one building under construction.

Principals
 Manuel O. Mari led the "Urduja Business High School" from  2008 to 2011.                                               
 Luisito C. Orma led the school from 2011 to 2014. He is a former principal of Caloocan City Science High School.
 Marivic Cruz led the school from 2014 to 2015.
 Ginalyn B. Dignos led the school from 2015 to November 12, 2015. She is a former principal of Caloocan National Science and Technology High School.
 Ma. Nimfa U. David: from 2015 to 2020 She is a former principal of Baesa High School.
 Dr. Ivee C. Parez: October 2020 to August 2021
 Tirso R. Dela Cruz: Present

History and Founding

2008

Caloocan Mayor Enrico Echiverri on Sunday announced the opening of the city's first business and technical skills-oriented public high school in June.

According to Echiverri, the government-run business high school is in what was originally Urduja High School in Barangay 172, in the city's first district.

He said that what sets the Urduja Business High School apart from other secondary high schools is that "besides following the Basic Education Curriculum ... the Urduja Business High School would also educate students with business and management subjects."

Echiverri said an apprentice of the public trade school is expected to learn essential skills and capabilities to be self-reliant and have a strong business sense.

Urduja Elementary School principal Carmelita Kilala said other specialized secondary schools, like science high schools, may emphasize additional science and math subjects into their curriculum. "With the city’s business high school, students learn not only math for example but business math, business English instead of basic English, and so on," Kilala said. "Students would also be introduced to basic and simple accounting, finance, information technology systems, marketing, organizational behavior, human resource management, and problem solving analysis," she added.

Echiverri said some 200 applicants were able to pass the rigid entrance examinations facilitated by faculty members of the Caloocan City Science High School about a month ago.

Echiverri hopes his "pet project" in partnership with the Division of City Schools would result in more entrepreneurs and businessmen rather than employees being produced by Caloocan in the near future.

2011

In 2011 The name of the school was changed from Urduja Business High School (UBHS) to Caloocan City Business High School (CCBHS).

2016

In 2016 Caloocan City Business High School (CCBHS) started to offer 2 tracks in Senior High School in accordance to the resolution that ordered by the Department of Education. The ABM (Accountancy. Business, And Management) and TVL (Technical Vocational Livelihood or TechVoc) that has 2 strands, Cookery and ICT (Information, Communication, and Technology).

2017

In 2017 Caloocan City Business High School (CCBHS) started to offer HUMSS (Humanities and Social Sciences) for Senior High School.

2018

The school started offering Science, Technology, Engineering and Mathematics (STEM) strand for Senior High School.

Vision

A Learning Institution that produce holistic individual business oriented and globally competent.

Mission

A learning institution that creates individuals who are intelligent, business oriented and morally upright through combined responsibility of all stake holders.

School newspaper

The Merchant (Official English Publication Of Caloocan City Business High School) and Ang Merkader (Official Filipino Campus Newspaper Of Caloocan City Business High School).

2016 Division Schools Secondary Press Conference and Contests

The Merchant and And Merkader journalists competed in the 2016 Division Schools Press Conference and Contests (Secondary) with the theme, "Strengthening Freedom Of information Through Campus Journalism" held on October 4, 2016, at Camarin High School. Caloocan City Business High School joined seven individual categories. The closing program of DSSPC was held on October 20, 2016. All writers who are listed in the Top 10 per category are qualified to compete in 40th Regional Secondary Schools Press Conference on November 16, 2016.

Awards:

Feature Writing, 1st place (Anson Gel Pangan)
Editorial Writing - 3rd place (Mark Julius Broqueza)
Science and Health Writing - 7th place (Mark Anthony Lopez)
Pagsulat ng Balitang Agham - 5th place (Eugene Quilanita)
Pagsulat ng Lathalain - 9th place (Kym Lyn Bernardo)
Pagkuha ng Larawan - 9th place (Joshua Jimenez)

2017 Division Schools Secondary Press Conference and Contests

With the theme "21st Century Campus Journalists: Vanguards of Truth and Change", the Merchant and Ang Merkader journalists has bagged another award for the 2017 Division Schools Secondary Press Conference and Contests.

Awards:

News Writing, 1st place - Trisha May Banzon
Editorial writing, 2nd place - Riza  Angeline De Jesus
Feature Writing, 4th place - Anson Gel Pangan
Copyreading and Headline writing 4th place - Melt Jomary Mendoza
Pagsulat ng balita, 1st place- Alyssa Piolen
Pagsulat ng balitang agham, 2nd place - Ariza Anjeli Diola
Pagsulat ng lathalain, 6th place- Zandrea Mae Gagote

CCBHS Journalists was recognized as rank 4 top-performing school in the division of Caloocan.

School paper advisers

English-  Norman Sabido- Rank 3 best performing SPA in  Division of Caloocan

Filipino-  Lou Laine G. Pillora- Rank 4 best performing SPA in Division of Caloocan

2017 Regionals School Secondary Press Conference and Contests

Pagsulat ng Balitang Agham, 1st Place- Ariza Anjeli Diola

Campus

The campus include a four-storey orange building; it is the first and main building of the school. It houses the Science Laboratory, administrative office, clinic, and the four faculty rooms.

A three-storey orange building was added during the 2014–2015 school year. It houses the Library, TLE laboratory and Computer Laboratory . The Computer Laboratory was used for the ICT lessons and hands-on activities of ICT students in Junior and Senior High School.

The Senior High School Building is a cream-colored 16 classrooms, four-storey building.

A 12 classrooms, four-storey building is currently being built. This building is in the progress of establishment to accommodate the enrollees.

Conjointly, Mrs. David (the Principal) had already sent out requests for the construction of the school's own covered court area and another two buildings.

Activities
 TLE Month: July
 Filipino Month: August
 Science Month: September 
 A.P. Month: October
 English Month: November 
(E.s.P.) Month: December 
 Mathematics Month: January
 MAPEH Month: February

Application and admission
All applicants must meet the following qualifications:
 Be a sixth grader who is a candidate for graduation from a public or private school preferably in Caloocan.
 Have a grade not lower than 83% in all subject areas per quarter. Since the test is administered before graduation, Third Grading grades should be considered.
 Be of good health condition, of good moral character, and should not have been involved in any violation of school rules and regulations or case of misbehavior during his/her stay in the elementary school and, more importantly, not a member of any fraternity.
 Pass the selection test and the interview of the Selection Committee.

Selection test

The examination consists of a battery of proficiency tests in Science, Mathematics, English, Filipino, and Business Education.

Requirements to be submitted upon filing: 
 Two pieces of 1x1 identical latest ID pictures with White background.
 Correctly and completely accomplished Caloocan City Business High School Forms.
 Authenticated photocopy of Form 138 (with Third Grading grades).
 Barangay certificate.
To be secured and submitted to Caloocan City Business High School. The date of submission of files and the date of the selection test will be announced by the school.

Awards

Mr. and Ms. Teen Red Cross 2012: Camille Burgos
CCBHS Elites hammered a 75–60 victory against the power-house Camarinians title led by their top shooting forward Kenneth Potenciano and top gunner Jacob Pascual.
CCBHS Champions the Street Dance Battle held at Monumento Circle, in commemoration of Andres Bonifacio's 150th birthday (November 30, 2013).
CCBHS Speech Choir bagged the 2nd place for 2013 Cluster-Division Meet held at Tala High School. (December 9, 2013)
First place Red Cross Speech Choir Caloocan held at Caloocan High School (August 31, 2014).
Mr. and Ms. Teen Red Cross 2014: Christine Joy B. Espanola.
Champion of SPARK 2014 held in University of the Philippines, SSG SY. 2014-2015
CHAMPION Project OSCAR 2014
Third place Red Cross Speech Choir Caloocan held at Robinsons Novaliches (August 30, 2015)
CHAMPION Brigada Eskwela 2015
Technolympics 2016-Division Level
First place in Cookery out of 16 participating schools. Third Place in Hair and Make-up out of 19 participating schools.
CCBHS bagged 1st place in 2016 Reading Proficiency in Grade 9 Division Level, held at Gregoria de Jesus Elementary School last November 21, 2016 (Riza Angeline De Jesus)
 Champion Brigada Eskwela 2017
 Ranked 4 in Division Level Journalism 2017. 
Technolympics 2017
First Place- Cookery Competition 
Second Place-CSS Competition 
Second Place-Beauty Care Competition 
Second Place-Landscaping Competition

References

 https://www.facebook.com/ccbhs2008/
 https://web.archive.org/web/20161130134742/http://www.deped.gov.ph/sites/default/files/memo/2016/DM_s2016_179.pdf
 https://web.archive.org/web/20171024205208/https://depedmarikina.ph/resource%20material/April%204,%202014%20Validation%20Updating%20of%20the%20SHS%20Early%20Implementation%20Data%20for%20Inspection.pdf

2008 establishments in the Philippines
Schools in Caloocan
Educational institutions established in 2008
High schools in Metro Manila
Public schools in Metro Manila